is a Japanese filmmaker and screenwriter. He is the son of film director Kinji Fukasaku and actress Sanae Nakahara.

Biography
He made his writing debut in the popular Japanese cult film Battle Royale, which his father directed. He wrote the screenplay to the sequel, Battle Royale II: Requiem, and took over directing when his father died of cancer. The film was released in Japan during the winter of 2003.

In 2005, he directed a film called  which starred Battle Royale'''s Tarō Yamamoto. His adaptation of the manga Sukeban Deka was released in 2006, under the title Yo-Yo Girl Cop. He also directed horror film X-Cross.

Filmography
Actor
 The Challenge (1982)

Screenwriter
 Battle Royale (2000)
 Battle Royale II: Requiem (2003)

Director
 Battle Royale II: Requiem (2003)
 Under the Same Moon (2005)
 Yo-Yo Girl Cop (2006)
 X-Cross (2007)
 Rebellion: The Killing Isle (2008) 
 Black Rat (2010)
 We Can't Change the World. But, We Wanna Build a School in Cambodia. (2011)
 My Summertime Map (2013)
 Ken to Merii: Ameagari no Yozora ni'' (2013)

References

External links
 
 

Japanese film directors
People from Tokyo
1972 births
Living people
Japanese screenwriters
Seijo University alumni